The 2010–11 season was Iraklis 30th consecutive (and 51st in total) season in the Super League Greece.

Transfers

In

Out

Club

Management

Kit

|
|
|

Other information

Pre-season and friendlies

† Match abandoned after 70 minutes.

Super League Greece

League table

Results summary

Results by round

Matches

Greek Cup

Matches

Player statistics
¹ Denotes player has left the club in the January transfer window. ² Denotes player joined in the January transfer window.

References

Greek football clubs 2010–11 season
2010-11